Jermaine Bell is a Montserratian footballer who plays as a defender for Diamond Valley United.

Career

In 2014, Bell signed for Australian sixth tier side Williamstown SC. In 2015, he signed for Shoreham in the English ninth tier. After that, he signed for Australian fifth tier club Diamond Valley United.

References

External links
 

Montserratian footballers
Living people
Association football defenders
Shoreham F.C. players
Montserrat international footballers
Montserratian expatriate footballers
Expatriate soccer players in Australia
Year of birth missing (living people)